Nawab Mehboob Alam Khan is an Indian food connoisseur and culinary expert of Hyderabadi cuisine. He has restored many lost recipes of the Hyderabadi tradition.

Early life
Mehboob Alam Khan was born in Hyderabad in a noble family. He did his schooling at St. George's Grammar School. His father, Shah Alam Khan, was the founder of the Hyderabad Deccan Cigarette Factory, as well as an educator and eminent personality of Hyderabad.

Career
Mehboob Alam Khan's family owns Hyderabad Deccan Cigarette Factory in Hyderabad. He is the director of Anwar-uloom educational society.

Culinary interests
Mehboob Alam Khan researched on the Hyderabadi cuisine for many years. He works as a consultant for Taj Group of Hotels. He also works with the government for their state dinners, and he is the stakeholder in taj holdings

He also has a chain of restaurants, MAK's Kitchens, which serves authentic Hyderabadi food. His nephew, Qutub Alam Khan, owns Chicha's, another Hyderabadi restaurant at Lakdi ka pul.

References

Biryani, Hyderabad
Living people
Indian chefs
Chefs of Indian cuisine
Year of birth missing (living people)